The legislative districts of Nueva Ecija are the representations of the province of Nueva Ecija in the various national legislatures of the Philippines. The province is currently represented in the lower house of the Congress of the Philippines through its first, second, third, and fourth congressional districts.

History 
Nueva Ecija constituted Nueva Ecija into a single assembly district for the Malolos Congress, wherein it was represented by three delegates, from 1898 to 1899. Philippine Commission Act No. 1582 later revived the district for the first elections to the lower chamber of the bicameral Philippine Legislature in 1907. The province was later divided into two districts with the enactment of Act No. 3336 on December 7, 1926; their separate representatives were first elected in the 1928 elections.

When seats for the upper house of the Philippine Legislature were elected from territory-based districts between 1916 and 1935, the province formed part of the third senatorial district which elected two out of the 24-member senate.

During the Japanese occupation of the Philippines in the Second World War, two delegates represented Nueva Ecija in the unicameral National Assembly of the Second Philippine Republic: one was the provincial governor (an ex officio member), while the other was indirectly elected through local conventions of KALIBAPI party members.

The pre-war two-representative district configuration was restored upon the re-establishment of the Philippine Commonwealth in 1945, and lasted until the disbandment of Congress in 1972 as a result of the declaration of Martial Law. Two chartered cities created during this period — Cabanatuan (1950) and Palayan (1965) — remained part of the second congressional district of Nueva Ecija, by virtue of Republic Act No. 526 (§90) and Republic Act No. 4475 (§42), respectively.

Nueva Ecija was represented in the Interim Batasang Pambansa as part of Region III from 1978 to 1984, and elected four representatives, at large, to the Regular Batasang Pambansa in 1984.

The province was reapportioned into four congressional districts under the new Constitution which was proclaimed on February 11, 1987, and elected members to the restored House of Representatives starting that same year.

Current Districts 
 LakasCMD (1)
 Nacionalista (1)
 NUP (1)
 PDPLaban (1)

Historical Districts

Lone District (defunct) 

Notes

At-Large (defunct)

1898–1899

1943–1944

1984–1986

References 

Nueva Ecija
Politics of Nueva Ecija